Madawaska Collins Field Aerodrome  is located  north of Madawaska, Ontario, Canada.

References

Registered aerodromes in Ontario